Alejandro Falla was the defending champion, but chose to compete in ATP 250 tournament in Kuala Lumpur instead.
Carlos Salamanca defeated Júlio Silva 7–5, 3–6, 6–3 in the final.

Seeds

Draw

Finals

Top half

Bottom half

References
Main Draw
Qualifying Singles

Seguros Bolivar Open Cali - Singles
2010 Singles